Staunton City Schools is the public school district of Staunton, Virginia.

Schools

 T.C. McSwain Elementary School
 A.R. Ware Elementary School
 Bessie Weller Elementary School
 Shelburne Middle School
 Staunton High School
 Dixon Educational Center (includes Genesis Alternative Education Program)

References

External links
 Staunton City Schools

Staunton, Virginia
School divisions in Virginia